Carin is a given name and surname. As a given name it is a variant spelling of Karin. Notable persons with the name Carin include:

Persons with the given name
 Carin Cone (born 1940), American swimmer
 Carin du Rietz (1766–1788), Swedish soldier
 Carin Goldberg (1953-2023), American graphic artist
 Carin Göring (1888–1931), Swedish first wife of Hermann Göring.
 Carin Götblad (born 1956), Swedish police commissioner 
 Carin Greenberg, American television writer
 Carin Jämtin (born 1964), Swedish politician
 Carin Jennings-Gabarra (born 1965), American soccer player
 Carin Koch (born 1971), Swedish golfer
 Carin Lundberg (born 1944), Swedish politician
 Carin Månsdotter (1550–1612), Queen of Sweden
 Carin Nilsson (1904–1999), Swedish swimmer
 Carin Runeson (born 1947), Swedish politician
 Carin ter Beek (born 1970), Dutch rower

Persons with the surname
 Jon Carin (born 1964), American artist and musician

See also
 Carine (given name)
 Karin (given name)
 Caren (disambiguation)
 Caryn
 Karen (disambiguation)

Swedish feminine given names